Carl Adolph Kraft (7 February 1876 – 11 February 1964) was a Danish equestrian. He competed in two events at the 1912 Summer Olympics.

References

External links
 

1876 births
1964 deaths
Danish male equestrians
Olympic equestrians of Denmark
Equestrians at the 1912 Summer Olympics
Sportspeople from Copenhagen